Salm-Kyrburg was a state of the Holy Roman Empire located in present-day Rhineland-Palatinate, Germany, one of the various partitions of Salm. It was twice created: the first time as a Wild- and Rhinegraviate (partitioned from Upper Salm), and secondly as a Principality (succeeding the earlier Principality of Salm-Leuze). The first state of Salm-Kyrburg was partitioned between itself, Salm-Mörchingen and Salm-Tronecken in 1607, and was inherited by Salm-Neuweiler in 1681 upon the lines' extinction.

In 1742, Salm-Kyrburg was raised to a principality; it shared its vote in the Reichstag with Salm-Salm. Salm-Kyrburg was annexed by France in 1798; this was recognized by the Holy Roman Empire in the Treaty of Lunéville of 1801. As a compensation, the princes were granted new territories formerly belonging to the Bishops of Münster in 1802, which formed the newly founded Principality of Salm.

The full title used by the Princes of the resurrected state was "Prince of Salm-Kyrburg, Sovereign Prince of Ahaus, Bocholt and Gemen, Wildgrave of Dhaun and Kyrburg, Rhinegrave of Stein".

The last prince, Frederick VI, morganatically married Louisa le Grand, with their descendants being created Barons of Rennenberg by Wilhelm II in 1917, but were deemed inelligible to inherit the title of Prince of Salm-Kyburg. With his death in 1905, the Salm-Kyburg family went extinct.

Princes of Salm-Kyrburg

Wild- and Rhinegraves (1499–1681) 
 John VII (1499–1531)
 John VIII (1531–1548)
 Otto I (1548–1607)
 John Casimir (1607–1651)
 George Frederick (1651–1681)

Sovereign princes (1743–1813)
 Philip Joseph (Wild- and Rhinegrave of Salm-Leuze) (1743–1779)
 Frederick III (1779–1794)
 Frederick IV (1794–1813)

Mediatised princes within Prussia (1813–1905)
 Frederick IV (1813–1859)
 Frederick V (1859–1887)
 Frederick VI (1887–1905) 

States and territories established in 1499
Counties of the Holy Roman Empire
 
1798 disestablishments